The Pongaponga were an indigenous Australian people of the Northern Territory.  They may have been a band of the Ngolokwangga.

Country
They inhabited the area along both banks of the Daly River somewhat inland from the Wogait coastal tribe.

Alternative names
 Pongo-pongo
 Djiramo. (?)

Notes

Citations

Sources

Aboriginal peoples of the Northern Territory